Porsha may refer to:

Places 
 Porsha Upazila, an upazila of Naogaon District in Rajshahi, Bangladesh

People 
 Porsha Ferguson (born 1989), American actress
 Porsha Lawrence Mavour, English actress who played Kelsey Hooper in The Sarah Jane Adventures
 Porsha Phillips (born 1988), American professional women's basketball player
 Porsha Stubbs-Smith, Turks and Caicos Islander politician
 Porsha Williams (born 1981), American television personality, model, and actress

Fictional characters 
 Porsha Taylor, character played by Ta'Rhonda Jones in 2015 U.S. TV series Empire
 Porsha Crystal, a character from the animated film Sing 2

See also 

 La'Porsha Renae (born 1993), American singer-songwriter
 Porsche (disambiguation)